The Lost Letter or A Lost Letter may refer to:

Literature

 The Lost Letter: A Tale Told by the Sexton of the N...Church, a tale from the collection Evenings on a Farm Near Dikanka by Nikolai Gogol

Film

 The Lost Letter (1945 film), a Soviet animated film directed by Lamis Bredis, Zinaida Brumberg and Valentina Brumberg
 The Lost Letter (1972 film), a Soviet musical-tragicomedy film directed by Borys Ivchenko
 A Lost Letter (1953 film), a  Romanian historical comedy film directed by Sica Alexandrescu and Victor Iliu